Sgurr a' Choire Ghlais is a mountain in the North-west Highlands of Scotland. It lies between Glen Strathfarrar and Glen Orrin and it is an excellent viewpoint, being the highest mountain in its group - a group which includes the Munros of Sgurr na Ruaidhe, Sgurr Fhuar-thuill and Carn nan Gobhar. Northwards there is no higher ground apart from the Fannichs.

It is one of the most difficult hills to reach in Scotland, the shortest route involving a 10-mile approach up Glen Strathfarrar. A bicycle, or permission to drive along the private road up Strathfarrar, may shorten the approach.

See also

 List of mountains of the British Isles by relative height
 List of Munros
 List of Marilyns in the Northern Highlands

Footnotes

Marilyns of Scotland
Munros
One-thousanders of Scotland